Attorney General Stratton may refer to:

Hal Stratton (born 1950), Attorney General of New Mexico
Wickliffe Stratton (1869–1936), Attorney General of Washington

See also
General Stratton (disambiguation)